This page documents the tornadoes and tornado outbreaks of 1994, primarily in the United States. Most tornadoes form in the U.S., although some events may take place internationally. Tornado statistics for older years like this often appear significantly lower than modern years due to fewer reports or confirmed tornadoes, however by the 1990s tornado statistics were coming closer to the numbers we see today.

Synopsis

In the first three months of the year, the number of tornadoes and tornado outbreaks were low to moderate. Then from April to August each month had a total of over a hundred tornadoes. The fall season saw fewer tornadoes with the exception of a moderate outbreak in November. The killer F4 tornado that struck Piedmont, Alabama on Palm Sunday (a date of infamous tornado outbreaks in 1965 and 1920) killed 22 people, the most since the 1990 Plainfield, Illinois tornado.

Events

United States yearly total

January
There were a total of 13 tornadoes confirmed and in January.

January 26–27
Four tornadoes touched down in Mississippi, including one F2 tornado that caused seven injuries in the city of Brookhaven, Mississippi.

February
There were 9 tornadoes confirmed in February.

March

There were 58 tornadoes confirmed in March.

March 27

The third notable tornado outbreak to occur on Palm Sunday and the second in the Southeastern United States, this deadly series of 27 tornadoes became the most notable tornado event of the year, resulting in 40 fatalities. Two tornadoes were rated F4, including the Piedmont, Alabama tornado that killed 22 people.

April

205 tornadoes were confirmed in April.

April 11–15 
Tornadoes touched down across several states, resulting in six fatalities. An F2 touched down on the west shore of Lake Houston, moved across the lake and crossed the eastern shore and into a subdivision. One woman died when a mobile home park was hit.

April 25–27

A widespread tornado outbreak affected much of the United States from Colorado to New York. The outbreak killed at least six people across two states from two F4 tornadoes near Dallas, Texas and Lafayette, Indiana.

May
161 tornadoes were confirmed in May.

June
234 tornadoes were confirmed in June.

June 13–14
Four tornadoes touched down on June 13, including an F2 tornado in Jackson, Michigan and another F2 tornado in Olean, New York. Three weak tornadoes also touched down the next day.

June 18
At least one tornado was confirmed in St. Francis/Portage Lake, Maine and caused two injuries.

June 25–27
Tornadoes on June 25 and 
June 27 resulted in three fatalities in Missouri and Georgia.

July
155 tornadoes were confirmed in July.

July 5
An F4 tornado struck Maribel, Wisconsin. Fortunately, no fatalities were reported.

July 10 (Canada)
An F4 tornado struck areas south of Birtle, Manitoba, damaging several farmsteads and injuring two. It was on the ground for 29.2 km (18.1 mi).

July 27
An F3 tornado killed three people in Limerick, Pennsylvania.

August
120 tornadoes were confirmed in August.

August 4 (Canada)
An F3 struck the Aylmer, Quebec area just outside Ottawa. Several homes were destroyed and hundreds others were damaged, extensively. A total of 15 people were injured and damage was estimated at $15 million. It was the first F3 in the Canadian province of Quebec since the Maskinonge/Pierreville area tornado of August 27, 1991.

August 27
A deadly outbreak produced 12 tornadoes, including two F3 tornadoes that resulted in four fatalities in Wisconsin.

September
30 tornadoes were confirmed in September.

October
51 tornadoes were confirmed in October.

November
42 tornadoes were confirmed in November.

November 26–28
A small but destructive outbreak produced over 20 tornadoes across the Southern United States, resulting in six fatalities and 45 injuries. An F3 tornado tore through Shelby and Fayette County, Tennessee, killing three after destroying 28 homes, damaging 300 other homes and badly damaging a high school. A woman was killed when an F3 tornado struck her house. Two more people were killed in an F3 tornado in Mississippi.

December
4 tornadoes were confirmed in December.

See also
 Tornado
 Tornadoes by year
 Tornado records
 Tornado climatology
 Tornado myths
 List of tornado outbreaks
 List of F5 and EF5 tornadoes
 List of North American tornadoes and tornado outbreaks
 List of 21st-century Canadian tornadoes and tornado outbreaks
 List of European tornadoes and tornado outbreaks
 List of tornadoes and tornado outbreaks in Asia
 List of Southern Hemisphere tornadoes and tornado outbreaks
 List of tornadoes striking downtown areas
 Tornado intensity
 Fujita scale
 Enhanced Fujita scale

References

External links
 U.S. tornadoes in 1994 - Tornado History Project
 Tornado fatalities monthly

 
1994 meteorology
Tornado-related lists by year
1994-related lists